Livistona fulva is a palm species, restricted in distribution to the Blackdown Tablelands in central Queensland, Australia. Livistona fulva is a tall solitary palm. In nature, it grows in open forests; in cultivation. it prefers a warm temperate climate and sunny position.

References

External link 
 Livistona fulva at the Palm and Cycad Societies of Australia

fulva
Palms of Australia
Flora of Queensland
Taxa named by Tony Rodd